Moussa Koné (born 30 December 1996) is a Senegalese professional footballer who plays as a forward for Ligue 2 club Nîmes.

Career

FC Zürich, Dynamo Dresden
In January 2018, Koné left Swiss Super League side FC Zürich to join Dynamo Dresden of the 2. Bundesliga. He signed a -year contract until 2022 with the German club.

Nîmes
On 22 January 2020, Koné signed for Nîmes Olympique in Ligue 1 on a three-year contract for a fee of £2.70 million. He was brought in as Nîmes were struggling for goals and were 19th in Ligue 1 at the time of his signing having only scored 15 goals, the joint lowest in the division.

Career statistics

References

1996 births
Living people
Footballers from Dakar
Senegalese footballers
Association football forwards
Senegal youth international footballers
Swiss Super League players
Swiss Challenge League players
Swiss Promotion League players
2. Bundesliga players
Ligue 1 players
FC Zürich players
Dynamo Dresden players
Nîmes Olympique players
Senegalese expatriate footballers
Senegalese expatriate sportspeople in Switzerland
Expatriate footballers in Switzerland
Senegalese expatriate sportspeople in Germany
Expatriate footballers in Germany